"Don't Cry" is a song by American hard rock band Guns N' Roses, two versions of which were released simultaneously on different albums. The version with the original lyrics is the fourth track on Use Your Illusion I, while the version with the alternate lyrics is the 13th track on Use Your Illusion II. Only the vocal tracks differ, and even then only in the verses; however, in those verses, not only are the words entirely different, but the meter and melody are also slightly different. There is also a third version, officially released only on the single for the song, which was recorded during Appetite for Destruction sessions in 1986.

The song reached the top 10 in many countries, including peaking at number eight on the UK Singles Chart and number 10 on the US Billboard Hot 100. In Ireland, "Don't Cry" became Guns N' Roses' second number-one single, and in Finland, it became the second number-one hit from the Use Your Illusion albums. The song also topped Portugal's music chart, reached number two in New Zealand and Norway, and peaked within the top five in Australia, Denmark, and Switzerland.

Composition and recording
Stradlin and Rose wrote the song (with the working title "Don't You Cry Tonight") in March 1985, shortly after Guns N' Roses was formed in Los Angeles. In fact, at a show in Atlantic City, NJ on September 12, 2021, Rose claimed it was "the first song that was written for Guns N’ Roses.” In the Special Collector's Edition of Rolling Stone dedicated to the band, Kory Grow quotes Rose:

At the September 2021 Atlantic City show cited above, Rose told the crowd:

After a low guitar drone, the song evolves into a hard rock lullaby that turns into a hard-hearted kiss-off, ending with an edgy, sustained vocal drone that is more scary than reassuring. In his book Over the Top: The True Story of Guns N' Roses, Mark Putterford notes the song's contrast with much of the other material on the Illusion albums, citing Rose's "deeply ingrained whore/madonna dichotomy" and his "dew-eyed romantic cooing with tenderness." "Don't Cry" features Shannon Hoon of Blind Melon as a co-lead vocalist. Hoon sings an octave higher than Rose, and his voice is placed further back in the mix.  In his autobiography, Slash states that Hoon's harmony vocal "made that song all the more soulful."  Along with "Estranged" and "November Rain," it forms a narrative inspired in part by the short story "Without You" by Del James.

Music video
The official music video for the song was directed by Andy Morahan and Mark Racco. John Linson was the producer of the video.

Rose commented on the difficulty of filming the video and how certain scenes inspired by his relationship with Erin Everly affected him emotionally:

Izzy Stradlin did not attend the music video shoot by the time the band came to film the video and therefore does not appear in the video for the song he co-wrote. A month later, it was announced he had quit the band. A sign saying 'Where's Izzy' can be seen in the video.  Stradlin later deemed the multi-million dollar video "a pointless indulgence."

Live performances

"Don't Cry" was performed quite frequently during the early tours and the Use Your Illusion Tour. It was absent from the early legs (i.e. 2001–02) of the Chinese Democracy Tour but reappeared to an extent in 2006, as guitarist Bumblefoot began using an instrumental version of the song as a guitar solo spot. In 2007, during the Bumblefoot solo spot, Axl came on stage to sing along to the solo on two occasions, marking the first times since 1993 that Axl had sung it live.

"Don't Cry" made another return during the 2009/2010 World Tour, with Axl singing along with the solo spot on each occasion that it has been played.

A recording of the song from the Tokyo Dome was released on the album Live Era '87–'93 and a VHS/DVD. A further recording was issued on Appetite for Democracy 3D.

Track listing
CD single 
 "Don't Cry" (original) – 4:42
 "Don't Cry" (alt. lyrics) – 4:42
 "Don't Cry" (demo – 1985 Mystic Studio Sessions) – 4:42

Personnel
 W. Axl Rose – lead vocals
 Slash – lead guitar
 Izzy Stradlin – rhythm guitar, backing vocals
 Duff McKagan – bass, backing vocals
 Matt Sorum – drums
 Dizzy Reed – keyboard

Additional musicians
 Shannon Hoon – co-lead vocals
 Steven Adler – drums (demo version)

Charts

Weekly charts

Year-end charts

Certifications

References

Works cited
 
 
 

1991 singles
1991 songs
Geffen Records singles
Guns N' Roses songs
Irish Singles Chart number-one singles
Music videos directed by Andy Morahan
Number-one singles in Finland
Number-one singles in Portugal
Song recordings produced by Mike Clink
Songs written by Axl Rose
Songs written by Izzy Stradlin
Songs about infidelity